State Road 61 (NM 61) is a state highway in the US state of New Mexico. NM 61's southern terminus is at U.S. Route 180 (US 180), and the  northern terminus is at NM 152.

Major intersections

See also

References

061
Transportation in Grant County, New Mexico
Transportation in Luna County, New Mexico